Raghunathpur College, established in 1961, is one of the oldest colleges in Raghunathpur, Purulia district. It offers undergraduate courses in arts, commerce and sciences. It is affiliated to Sidho Kanho Birsha University.

Departments

BCA

C
C++
JAVA

Science

Chemistry 
Physics 
Mathematics 
Botany
Zoology

Arts and Commerce

Bengali
English
Sanskrit
History
Political Science
Philosophy
Economics
Commerce
geography

Accreditation
The college is recognized by the University Grants Commission (UGC). It was accredited by the National Assessment and Accreditation Council (NAAC), and awarded B grade, an accreditation that has since then expired.

See also

References

External links
Raghunathpur College
Sidho Kanho Birsha University
University Grants Commission
National Assessment and Accreditation Council

Colleges affiliated to Sidho Kanho Birsha University
Educational institutions established in 1961
Academic institutions formerly affiliated with the University of Burdwan
Universities and colleges in Purulia district
1961 establishments in West Bengal